The following lists events that happened during 1998 in Iraq.

Incumbents
 President: Saddam Hussein
 Prime Minister: Saddam Hussein
 Vice President: Taha Muhie-eldin Marouf 
 Vice President: Taha Yassin Ramadan

Events

November
 November 13 - After Iraq commits to United Nations Special Commission, American President Bill Clinton cancels scheduled air raids on the country.
 November 23 - Iraq stops their UNSCOM partnership. 

 
Years of the 20th century in Iraq
1990s in Iraq
Iraq
Iraq